William Henry Kearney,  (–1858) was an English water-colour painter of landscapes and figure subjects.

Life 

William Henry Kearney, born in 1800 or 1801, was probably the child of that name, son of John and Eleanor Kerney, who was baptised at St Mary's, Rotherhithe, London, on 3 May 1801. He was admitted to the Royal Academy Schools on 18 November 1823 at the age of twenty-two.

He was one of the foundation members in 1831, and subsequently a vice-president of the New Society of Painters in Water Colours (later renamed the Institute of Painters in Water Colours). He exhibited at their first exhibition in 1834, and would go on to exhibit 170 pictures there. He had previously been an exhibitor at the Royal Academy, commencing in 1823. He exhibited nine times at the Royal Academy between 1823 and 1850.

Kearney died at his at his home, 114 High Holborn, London, on 25 June 1858, aged fifty-seven. He was survived by his wife, whose name may have been Hester.

Works 
Kearney worked in the early pure manner of water-colour painting, and his works have been highly valued. There are two fair examples, views in Wales, in the print room at the British Museum; another two  are in the collections of the Victoria and Albert Museum.

Among his works were Love's Young Dream, Ruins of the Sally-port, Framlingham (now in the National Gallery of Ireland), and The Courtship of Quintin Matsys, and The Fatal Picture.

He published Illustrations of the Surrey Zoological Gardens (3 parts, 1832).

References

Citations

Bibliography 

 Baker, Anne Pimlott (2004). "Kearney, William Henry (1800/01–1858), watercolour painter". In Oxford Dictionary of National Biography. Oxford University Press.
 Bryan, Michael; Williamson, George Charles, eds. (1904). "KEARNEY, William Henry". In Bryan's Dictionary of Painters and Engravers. New Edition. Vol. 3. New York: The Macmillan Company.
  
 Oliver, Valerie Cassel, ed. (2011). "Kearney, William Henry". In Benezit Dictionary of Artists. Oxford University Press.
 Redgrave, Samuel; Redgrave, Francis Margaret (1878). "KEARNEY, William Henry". In A Dictionary of Artists of the English School. London: George Bell & Sons.

External links 

 "William Henry Kearney". (2014). The British Museum. Retrieved 4 April 2022.

1800 births
1858 deaths
19th-century English male artists
19th-century English painters
English watercolourists